Khandakar Oliuzzaman Alam is a Jatiya Party (Ershad) politician and the former Member of Parliament of Joypurhat-1. Alam was elected to parliament from Joypurhat-1 as a Jatiya Party candidate in 1988.

References

Jatiya Party politicians
Living people
4th Jatiya Sangsad members
Year of birth missing (living people)